P52 may refer to:

Vessels 
 , a patrol vessel of the Argentine Navy
 , a patrol vessel of the Indian Navy
 , a patrol vessel of the Irish Naval Service
 
 , a submarine of the Polish Navy

Other uses 
 Bell XP-52, an American fighter aircraft design project
 Cottonwood Airport, in Yavapai County, Arizona, United States
 NFKB2, nuclear factor NF-κB p100 subunit
 Rylands Library Papyrus P52, a biblical manuscript
 P52, a state regional road in Latvia